Timothy Lester (born 25 March 1964) was an English cricketer. He was a right-handed batsman. He was born in Hampstead.

Lester made his cricketing debut in the Minor Counties Championship for Oxfordshire during the 1984 season, and played regularly for the team for eleven seasons.

Lester made a single first-class appearance, for Minor Counties, during the 1990 season. In the only innings in which he batted, he scored 150 runs.

Lester made 7 List A appearances for Oxfordshire between 1989 and 1993. He was an upper-middle order batsman.

He is currently an English Teacher at International Grammar School in Sydney.

References

1964 births
Living people
English cricketers
Minor Counties cricketers
Oxfordshire cricketers